= Matapan railway station =

Railway station in Pakistan

Coordinates: 24.9156°N 67.2043°E

General information
- Owner: Ministry of Railways

Other information
- Station code: MTPN

History
- Former names: Great Indian Peninsula Railway
Location

Matapan railway station (Urdu: مٹاپان ریلوے اسٹیشن) is located in Pakistan. Latitude: 24°54'56.16" Longitude: 67°12'15.48" As of 2004, the station was closed.

== See also ==
- List of railway stations in Pakistan
- Pakistan Railways
